Fernando Vizcaíno Casas (1926–2003), was a Spanish labour lawyer, journalist and writer. His writings were generally supportive of Francoist Spain. During the 1970s and 1980s he collaborated with the director Rafael Gil on a number of films that supported this point of view.

References

Bibliography
 Mira, Alberto. Historical Dictionary of Spanish Cinema. Scarecrow Press, 2010.

:es:Fernando Vizcaíno Casas

1926 births
2003 deaths
Labour lawyers
Spanish male writers
20th-century Spanish lawyers